HMS Mentor was the Massachusetts letter of marque Aurora, commissioned in 1780. The Royal Navy captured her in July 1781 and took her into service as HMS Mentor. Mentor disappeared in 1783.

Letter of marque
Captain Porter, of Boston, commissioned Aurora  on 2 October 1780.

Aurora unloaded her cargo at Port-au-Prince and started to take on a cargo of sugar for France. While she was loading a squall struck her. The squall overturned and sank her, drowning several men in the process. She was salvaged and two weeks later sailed with her cargo to France. Aurora sailed from Lorient on 24 April 1781 and returned to Boston on 20 May.

On 16 June her owners posted bond for Aurora to operate as a privateer. She sailed in July in company with the Massachusetts privateer , James Munro, master, but the two ships separated.

The 74-gun ship  captured Aurora on 11 July 1781, or 18 July. She was at New York by 20 August.

Royal Navy
The Royal Navy purchased Aurora on 11 September 1781 at Boston.

Mentor was one of the naval vessels that shared in the capture of the brigs Unity and Betsey, on 20 January 1783.

After  wrecked on 21 August 1783 at Bermuda, Mentor was sent to take off the survivors. Mentor did so, but then disappeared. She was assumed to have foundered with all hands, including the survivors from Cerberus she taken on.

Citations and references
Citations

References
 
 

Ships built in Massachusetts
American Revolutionary War ships of the United States
Privateer ships
Captured ships
Ships of the Royal Navy
Maritime incidents in 1783
Missing ships
Warships lost with all hands
1780 ships